Cold Case is a 2021 Indian Malayalam-language crime thriller  directed by Tanu Balak and written by Sreenath V. Nath, that stars Prithviraj Sukumaran in the lead role and also features Aditi Balan, Pooja Mohanraj, Anil Nedumangad, Lakshmi Priyaa Chandramouli, Anand and Rajesh Hebbar in supporting roles. The plot follows two parallel investigations of a paranormal murder case by IPS officer  M. Sathyajith (Prithviraj) and investigative journalist Medha Padmaja (Aditi), who eventually cross paths.

The film marks the directorial debut of cinematographer Tanu Balak. With a formal announcement made in September 2020, the principal shooting of the film began on 31 October, and was completed on 7 December 2020. It was filmed mostly in Trivandrum around 36 days. Prakash Alex composed the film score while Gireesh Gangadharan and Jomon T. John jointley handled the cinematography, and Shameer Muhammed edited the film. Cold Case was released on 30 June 2021 on Amazon Prime Video, bypassing theatrical release due to COVID-19-related cinema closures.

Plot
The movie opens with a Hindu exorcism ritual in Varanasi and a Muslim exorcism ritual in Kerala.

Medha, a journalist leaves her news office while talking to her mother-in-law who is at an ashram. While driving home, A.C.P. M. Sathyajith is called in to investigate a murder, as a result of a skull being found in a bag from a river. Forensic analysis reveals that the murder  was committed over a year ago and the skull belongs to a female aged 25–30 years. The identity of the deceased is then sought. The dental implants on the skull, indicate that the victim was a female named Eva Maria, who was from a wealthy family and that her father had left her a fortune before his death. The police investigate her location and traces her family. Her stepmother tells him that she had married a Hindu and remained estranged from them for a while and that during the Easter of 2019, her father met her and possibly patched up things between them. The police also learn that all the land that Eva had inherited was quietly sold to an outsider.

On the other hand, Eva's spirit tries to contact Medha, a journalist currently seeking help for her daughter's custody case from Advocate Haritha, who is also a friend of Medha, as Eva's spirit needs Medha's help. Medha takes the help of an occult researcher, Zara Zacchai, who tells her the name of the soul as Eva Maria and Medha with the help of Advocate Haritha (who was Eva's lawyer for her divorce case) and Asif, a colleague starts her own investigation in parallel, unaware that the Police are investigating the case.

Sathyajith later meets Eva's ex-husband and finds out that he was deep in debt because of his divorce proceeding as he had to return 2.5 Crore that he had earlier borrowed from Eva to start his own production house. This debt was settled by his now father-in-law who is the owner of the media house where Medha works. Sathyajith traces Eva's last known location to a working women's hostel and through multiple witnesses concludes that she was last seen in September 2019 which is the period of her death. However, her phone was active till April 2020 and her Facebook account showed pictures posted in Varanasi till April 2020. He then traces a list of tourists who due to the lockdown were brought to the home state by a special government bus service. He finds Eva's name in that list and concludes that an imposter was posting pictures and sending messages to her friends so that no one reports her missing. Meanwhile, the dental advisor who helped them with the dental implants on the skull, tells him that sometime back they had recovered a human hand in Tamil Nadu and this possibly could link to this case. On analysis, it is found that the hand belonged to Eva and had strands of hair that might belong to the murderer.

During the investigation, Sathyajith learns that Medha is also in search of the truth. While they are discussing each other's findings, Sathyajith gets a phone call from his uncle who had seen the impersonator for Eva while returning from Varanasi. All the pieces of the puzzle fit into the place and Sathyajith detects that the killer is none other than Advocate Haritha. Haritha was neck-deep in debt when she was handling Eva's case. Her father died when a real estate project was mid-way in construction and she fears if the project is not delivered within a month's period she may be arrested. One day she takes Eva home on the pretext of talking her out of her grief and strangles her to death. Haritha then dismembers Eva's body, stores it in the fridge, and later scatters the pieces. She then creates fake documents assuming Eva's identity and sells off Eva's inheritance and restores her father's business, She takes Eva's phone to Varanasi and posts the pictures on Facebook, after which she throws Eva's phone into the river. She later boards a special government bus service for the trip back to Kerala.

Now alerted, Haritha goes to Medha's home to clean up the evidence. While she was there alone, she sees the same refrigerator that she had used to store Eva's remains and then, Haritha is killed when the refrigerator explodes. In the final scenes, we see Medha saying she was right about her beliefs that the refrigerator was possessed with Eva's soul. Sathyajith tells her that there would always be a conflict between faith and logic, as a police officer he can only rely on logic and terms this incident as an extraordinary accident. Later at Medha's ancestral house, her dead sister's picture breaks into pieces after Medha plays her radio.

Cast

Production

Development 
In September 2020, Prithviraj Sukumaran was reported to play the lead in an investigative thriller film produced by Anto Joseph, and cinematographer Tanu Balak was assigned to helm the project, making his directorial debut. Sreenath V. Nath scripted the film's story and screenplay, which is based on real-life incidents, although being stated by the makers as a fictional project and the team added that the film does not have action sequences. Cinematographer Jomon T. John, was the first crew member to be announced as part of the technical department, as the rest of the cast and crew were yet to be revealed. Aditi Balan was assigned as the female protagonist, whose character was based on journalism. Another cinematographer, Girish Gangadharan, joined the team, as did music composer, Prakash Alex, and editor, Shameer Muhammed.

Filming 
Balak added that, Prithviraj's portions were set mostly indoors and the film has mostly few scenes with crowds, which is set in Trivandrum. The film was launched on 31 October 2020, without Prithviraj as the actor was quarantined for a week, after being recovered from COVID-19. He later joined the shoot on 13 November. Stills from the film featuring Prithviraj in a khaki uniform was positively received by fans and the character name was further revealed as ACP M. Sathyajith. The first schedule of the film completed on 24 November 2020 and second schedule started subsequently. The second schedule was completed on 7 December 2020, by which production has been wrapped within a duration of 36 days.

Music 
The film's soundtrack and score is composed by Prakash Alex and lyrics written by Sreenath V Nath. The music album features one song "Eeran Mukil" sung by K. S. Harisankar, which was released on 25 June 2021.

Release
The film was initially planned for a direct-to-digital release in December 2020, was later delayed due to post-production difficulties. In the process, the producers later planned for a theatrical release, since theatres were allowed to operate with 50% occupancy, and fixed the date as 4 March 2021. But the film was postponed indefinitely, and producers reinstated the decision to release on over-the-top media service as the functioning of theatres were affected due to the second wave of COVID-19. Anto Joseph officially announced the plans of digital release, with the streaming rights of Cold Case and the Fahadh Faasil-starrer Malik, were sold to Amazon Prime Video.

On 16 June 2021, the makers announced the release date as 30 June 2021, with the teaser of the film being unveiled on the same day. The trailer was later unveiled on 18 June 2021. Cold Case released worldwide on Amazon Prime Video on the midnight 29 June, ahead of the original release, and was made available from streaming in 240 countries.

Reception
The Times of India-based critic Anna Mathews gave a rating of 3 out of 5 saying "the film has an innovative story track, with the investigative thriller running on two very different propositions, but in a parallel narrative". Sowmya Rajendran of The News Minute wrote that the screenplay in the first half is "intriguing", but criticised the writing as it had "failed to live up to the ambition of the script" with "the plot becomes less convincing as the film progresses". She rated 3 out of 5 in her review. S. R. Praveen of The Hindu called the film as an "underwhelming horror-thriller that squanders the promising premise that it had". He further called "The script is rather weak not just in using the thriller elements, but in the dialogue department too. Quite a few of the sequences have the characters, especially the police officers, stating the obvious to each other. This is compounded by the not so great dubbing for some characters."

Haricharan Pudipeddi of Hindustan Times called that the film "did take the road less taken with the identity of the murderer", but "the experiment needed a bit more work for the role was poorly written". Manoj Kumar R of The Indian Express gave 1-star rating out of 5 and pointed that the film has "a very conventional premise of a dead person seeking justice from beyond the grave or, in this case, out of a rickety fridge". Giving 2.5 out of 5 stars, Anna M. M. Vetticad of Firstpost called that the film is "wisely controlled when it dips into paranormal horror clichés such as sudden loud sounds, ominous music and abrupt movement" and called the film as a "reasonably engaging thriller, but it had the potential to be so much more". Critic Ramya Palisetty of India Today gave 3 out of 5 saying "the film has the right ingredients to keep you on the edge of the seat, but the lazily-written second half tests your patience".

Roktim Rajpal of Deccan Herald rated 1.5 out of 5 and called "the film fails to make an impact due to the lousy execution". Gauthaman Bhaskaran of News18 called the film as an "extremely amateurish attempt" with a "shoddily-written script that completely wastes Prithviraj's potential, which transformed him into a robotic-run-of the mill man". Meera Jacob, for the news magazine The Week, gave 3 out of 5 rating and called "the movie does hold the attention of the viewer, particularly during the first half. However, moving toward the climax, it seemed to have been a bit of a let-down [sic]... he mixing of genre holds an optimistic future when executed properly." Sajin Srijith of Cinema Express gave 2 out of 5 rating, and said "The film's eagerness to get to the final twist comes at the cost of not-so engaging storytelling". Sangita Nambiar of The Quint, gave 2.5 out of 5 stars rating, calling it as "a paranormal thriller meets police procedural, is a better-than-many watch but definitely not the best or one of the best, it is a watchable thriller, just have reasonably low expectations from it". Nirmal Narayanan of International Business Times wrote "Cold Case is not an impeccable crime thriller. It is just that average film that can be watched when you get some free time for Prithviraj Sukumaran and Aditi Balan".

Arjun Menon of Pinkvilla gave 3 stars out of 5 calling the film as "an old fashioned crime thriller that is designed to evoke the feel of a horror flick and murder mystery simultaneously which does offer a fairly neat premise with little fuzz and great precision in storytelling". Giving 3 out of 5, Sify called the film as an "okayish thriller", with "an almost predictable track and cliched moments". Behindwoods rated 2.5 out of 5 saying "Cold Case is technically lekker, a watchable thriller". A critic from 123Telugu rated 2.5 out of 5 stars and stated "the film is a poorly articulated whodunnit mystery that fails to hold the attention of the viewers all the way through, despite its interesting set-up". Moviecrow rated 2.75 out of 5 and called that "the film remains engaging with some good moments and thrills but that's about it. It never really has you play the guessing game nor is there a payoff."

References

External links 
 

Indian crime thriller films
2020s Malayalam-language films
2021 films
2021 crime thriller films
Fictional portrayals of the Kerala Police
Films shot in Thiruvananthapuram
Films not released in theaters due to the COVID-19 pandemic
Amazon Prime Video original films